Census-designated places (CDPs) are unincorporated communities lacking elected municipal officers and boundaries with legal status. In 2010, there were 118 census-designated places in Alabama.

Semmes- Mobile County *2013

See also
List of cities and towns in Alabama
List of unincorporated communities in Alabama

References

State of Alabama Census Designated Places - BVP20 - Data as of January 1, 2020

Alabama

Census-Designated